Klipfontein may refer to:

 , a Dutch ocean liner, WW II troop transport, sunk 1953

in South Africa
 Klipfontein, Western Cape
 Klipfontein, Mpumalanga, a town
 Klipfontein-A, a village on the R568 north of KwaMhlanga, Mpumalanga

See also
 Farm Klipfontein, Johannesburg